Florence Mwikali Mutua is a Kenyan politician from Busia town. A former member of the National Assembly of Kenya. A former Women representative for Busia county. She was the Women Representative for Busia county for two terms, from August 2013 to August 2022. Under the reign of the fourth president of Kenya, Uhuru Muigai Kenyatta. She served the two terms through Orange Democratic Movement. In the latest Kenyan election, the 2022 general election, she vied for the governor seat though she lost it to Paul Otuoma. Mutua is the only woman to vie for the gubernatorial race in Busia during the 2022 general election. If she had won, she would have become the first woman governor in Busia county.

Education and Career 
In 2007, Mutua began her academic journey. Between 2007 and 2009, she enrolled in Methodist University to pursue a Bachelor's degree in Human Resource.  She also studied a Diploma in Business and Office Management at the Kenya School of Business Studies. Mutua also pursued Diploma in Medical Secretariat at Kenya Polytechnic. She is also a Public Relation Officer having studied Diploma in Public relations at Wote College.

In 2010, Mutua studied Masters in Arts (project planning).

It was in 2013 that Mutua became a Women Representative for Busia County. A position she held for two terms till August 2022 through the opposition party, Orange Democratic Movement.

From May 2000 to October 2012, Mutua hold various positions from a Program Assistant to Human Resource Assistant and Operations at the United Nation Organization,

UNICEF.

In 1993, Mutua was a Medical Secretariat at Aga Khan Hospital till April 2000.

Mutua was also a member of both the Departmental Committee on Agriculture, Livestock & Cooperatives and in Committee on Regional Intergration from 2013 to 2017.

On October 2022, Mutua resigned from being the Deputy Secretary General for the Orange Democratic Movement.

References 

Year of birth missing (living people)
Living people